X Factor Slovakia is a Czech and Slovak reality television music competition created by Simon Cowell and produced by FremantleMedia, on TV Prima and TV JOJ. Based on the original UK show, and an addition to The X Factor franchise, the series finds new singing talent (solo artists and groups ages 12 and over), drawn from public auditions, and they compete against each other for votes. The winner is determined by the show's viewers SMS text voting, and is awarded a recording contract, worth €200,000.

The original judging consisted of Celeste Buckingham, Ondřej Brzobohatý, Sisa Sklovská and Oto Klempíř and Martin "Pyco" Rausch as hosts.

In December it was announced casting in Czech Republic. TV Prima broadcasting this season for Czech viewers and TV JOJ for Slovakian.

History
TV Prima and TV JOJ has licence for X Factor since 2011. Season in 2012 and 2013 was cancelled. In winter 2013, open casting was held in Slovakia and later in Czech Republic. In first season are 4 category: Boys, Girls, Groups and Over 28s. On January 3, 2014 the first judge of judging panel was announced – Celeste Buckingham. On January 21, 2014 was announced host Martin "Pyco" Rausch. On January 29, the entire judging panel was announced, including Celeste Buckingham, Sisa Sklovská, Ondřej Brzobohatý and Oto Klempíř.

Castings
Producers casting in Slovakia

Producers casting in Czech Republic

Castings in the Czech Republic were scheduled for December 14 and 15 but was held a month later. 
Open castings, which are already included as an official jury and the audience were filmed from February 3 to 10 in Bratislava Incheba Expo Arena.

Bootcamp 
This phase of the competition was filmed in the days February 10 to 12 also in Bratislava Incheba Expo Arena. To bootcamp was 104 contestants and at the end of bootcamp was the top 20 contestants in all four categories assigned to his mentor.

The 20 successful acts were: 
Boys: Matěj Bláha, Lukáš Grüner, Tibor Gyurcsík, Tomáš Kaliarik, Matěj Vávra
Girls: Kristína Kušnírová, Marina Laduda, Dáša Šarközyová, Katarína Ščevlíková, Anh La Thi Quynh
Over 28s: Monika Agrebi, Peter Bažík, Brigita Szelidová, Bronislav Vařílek, Miroslaw Witkowski
Groups: Crabslide, Lady Jam, Ricco & Claudia, The Joy$, The Moment

Judges houses 
5 contestants from each category were invited to homes his mentors that have emerged two best in each category. These are then fightin live shows.

{| class="wikitable plainrowheaders"
|+Summary of judges' houses
|-
! Judge
! Category
! Location
! Assistant
! Eliminated Contestants
|-
!scope="row"| Oto Klepíř
| Groups
| Music club SaSaZu (Prague)
| Nightwork
| Crabslide, Lady Jam, The Moment
|-
!scope="row"| Ondřej Brzobohatý
| Girls
| Obecní dům (Prague)
| Karel Gott
| Kristína Kušnírová, Dáša Šarközyová, Anh La Thi Quynh
|-
!scope="row"| Celeste Buckingham
| Boys
| Kempinsky River Park (Bratislava)
| Richard Müller
| Matěj Bláha, Lukáš Grüner, Tomáš Kaliarik 
|-
!scope="row"| Sisa Sklovská
| Over 28s
| Sisa's home (Bratislava)
| Helena Vondráčková
| Monika Agrebi, Bronislav Vařílek, Miroslaw Witkowski
|}

Contestants
Key
 – Winner
 – Runner-up
 – Third place

Live shows

Results summary

Key
 – Contestant was in the bottom two and had to sing again in the final showdown
 – Contestant received the fewest public votes and was immediately eliminated (no final showdown)
 – Contestant received the most public votes

Week 1 (May 11)
 Theme: Absolute hits
 Musical guests: Celeste Buckingham

Judges' votes to eliminate
 Brzobohatý: Matěj Vávra
 Buckingham: Marina Laduda
 Sklovská: Marina Laduda
 Klempíř: Marina Laduda

Week 2 (May 18)
 Theme: Dedication songs
 Musical guests: Ondřej Brzobohatý a Peter Cmorík, Peter Bič Project

Judges' votes to eliminate
 Klempíř: Matěj Vávra
 Sklovská: Matěj Vávra
 Buckingham: Brigita Szelidová
 Brzobohatý: Brigita Szelidová

With the acts in the bottom two receiving two votes each, the result was deadlocked and reverted to the earlier public vote. Szelidová received the fewest public votes and was eliminated.

Week 3: Final (May 25)
 Theme: Free choice; Mentor duet; Winner's song
 Musical guests: Richard Müller and Fragile
Part 1

Part 2

References

Czech reality television series
Slovak reality television series
Slovak music television series
Czech music television series
2010s Czech television series
2010s Slovak television series
2014 Czech television series debuts
2014 Slovak television series debuts
Czech television series based on British television series
Slovak television series based on British television series
Prima televize original programming
TV JOJ original programming